Elfrida is a feminine given name - see Elfriede. Elfrida may also refer to:

 Elfrida, Arizona, an unincorporated community in the United States
 618 Elfriede, an asteroid
, a Norwegian cargo ship in service from 1947 to 1959
, a United States Navy patrol vessel in commission in 1898, from 1899 to 1908, and from 1909 to 1918
Elfrida, a 1752 tragedy by William Mason
Elfrida, a 1985 opera by Hungarian composer Erzsébet Szőnyi (1924–2019)